Physical: 100 (often referred to as simply Physical 100) is a South Korean reality competition series on Netflix. The survival show was created by MBC's producer Jang Ho-gi. It premiered on January 24, 2023, and aired every Tuesday at 17:00 KST (08:00 GMT) timeslot. The finale was the ninth episode, which aired on February 21, 2023.

The show is originally in Korean, but is available on Netflix dubbed into English. The show's premise is to find the ideal human physique based on many tests of performance.

Netflix has not yet announced plans for a season two.

Format 
One hundred competitors, all known for their well-developed physical attributes and physique, go head-to-head against each other in various individual and team challenges, or 'quests' of strength, balance, agility, endurance, strong willpower and strategy. The competition is formatted like a tournament. Every participant has a plaster cast of their torso on set; if they are eliminated after a quest, they have to destroy the cast with a sledgehammer.

The show has often been compared to Squid Game, a 2021 South Korean survival drama television series, for their similarities in language and competition-elimination format.

Participants 
The show started off with 100 participants, 77 men and 23 women, with some being eliminated each episode. Many of the contestants are professional sportspeople for South Korea's national teams, or are fitness influencers.

Quests 

Each quest differs regarding both the physical challenge as well as the number of contestants at risk of elimination.

Quest 0: Hanging challenge 
The 100 contestants were split into two groups of 50 (based on a chosen number) and competed to hang from a bar raised above water for as long as they could. The contestants were ranked according to how long they hung onto the bar before falling into the water.

 Winner from Group 1 – Kim Kyung-baek, Korea Navy UDT/SEAL instructor
 Winner from Group 2 – Kim Min-cheol, ice climber and Korea National Park mountain rescue ranger

Quest 1: Death match challenge 
Contestants compete one-on-one to gain possession of a ball. The contestant with possession of the ball at the 3-minute mark proceeded to the next Quest, while the other contestant was eliminated. 

Before the quest, contestants were ranked based on their Quest 0 timing, and contestants that were ranked higher had the benefit to choose their opponent and the type of Battle Arena they want to compete in:

 Battle Arena A included many obstacles, emphasizing contestant agility and speed.
 Battle Arena B was simpler, with a large flat area of sand with a pool of water in the middle, emphasizing contestant strength and grappling ability.

If neither contestant had possession after three minutes, the competition was restarted with one minute on the clock. Fifty contestants were eliminated in the process.

Quest 2: Moving sand challenge 
Before Quest 2, the remaining 50 contestants were required to select the top three contestants that they would like to be in a team together with. The 10 contestants with the most votes were declared team leaders and ranked based on the total number of votes they received. 

 Team Leader 1 – Yun Sung-bin, skeleton racer, 2018 Winter Olympics gold medalist
 Team Leader 2 – Nam Kyung-jin, wrestler
 Team Leader 3 – Kwak Myung-sik, crossfitter and MMA fighter
 Team Leader 4 – Choo Sung-hoon, former judoka and MMA fighter, television personality
 Team Leader 5 – Hoju Tarzan, travel YouTuber
 Team Leader 6 – Kim Sang-wook, MMA fighter, Korea Navy UDT/SEAL reservist (sergeant)
 Team Leader 7 – Ma Sun-ho, bodybuilder
 Team Leader 8 – Jo Jin-hyeong, strongman and car dealer
 Team Leader 9 – Jang Seong-min, rugby player
 Team Leader 10 – Jang Eun-sil, wrestler
 
Contestants lined up for the team leader they wanted to join. Team leaders picked the four members to form a team of five. Team leaders with a higher rank had the advantage to pick their team members first over the other team leaders. Contestants not chosen had to pick another team. 

After selecting their team members, team leaders picked the team that they would like to compete against, not knowing what the quest challenge would be.

For Quest 2, each team of five had to work together to build a bridge, and then carry bags of sand across the bridge. Teams were not allowed to pass bags of sand to another team member; they had to carry the bags of sand individually to the other end. After twelve minutes, the team with the least amount of sand accumulated was eliminated. 

Team 10, which contained three women and two of the smaller men in the competition (one of whom was dealing with a minor knee injury sustained in Quest 1), were specifically chosen by Team 2 in order to secure an easy victory. Team 10's upset victory in their match was very narrow, later estimated by one of the competitors to be a single bag of sand. All other matches were won much more convincingly.

Quest 2.5: Revival challenge 
Exclusively for those who were eliminated in Quest 2, contestants were taken to another room, where they found their torsos hanging from the ceiling.

The game required all contestants to hold onto a rope connected to their torso, with 40% of the contestant's total body weight added, for as long as possible to prevent it from falling to the ground and breaking apart. The last five contestants holding their rope re-entered the competition for Quest 3.

Winners
 Kim Sang-wook, who was elected as leader of the surviving team
 Seong Chi-hyun
 Choi Sung-hyuk
 Shim Eu-ddeum
 Lee Jun-myeong

Quest 3: Ship moving challenge 
In Quest 3, the six teams had to join forces to create three teams of ten. The teams spent some time debating how they would join, with the last two excluded teams being joined by default.

The combined teams of ten had to each work together to dig up oak barrels from the sand and load them onto a 1.5-tonne ship. The additional weight of the oak barrels was 0.5-tonne, meaning the combined load weighed 2.0 tonnes. The teams then had to drag/push the ship off a wooden platform onto logs in the sand, across the sand-filled arena on the logs, then up a wooden ramp until they could pull a mooring rope over an iron stake. 

The two teams with the fastest time progressed to the next Quest, while the team with the slowest time was eliminated. 

Team 1 and Team 2 won with times of 13:34 and 19:55 respectively. Team 3 lost with a time of 22:15 and was eliminated.

Quest 4: Team delegate challenge 
The remaining 20 contestants returned to their original teams of five, deciding who among them would compete in each of five different games based on ancient mythology. The winner of each game would advance to the final, while the remaining contestants would be eliminated.

Game 1: Punishment of Atlas 
The Punishment of Atlas had contestants hold a  rock for as long as possible, until only one was left standing.

Winner

 Jo Jin-hyeong

Eliminations

 Shin Bo-mi-rae
 Kim Kang-min
 Kim Sik

Shin Bo-mi-rae was unable to lift the stone above her shoulders at all. Kim Kang-min dropped out after about 15 minutes. At just past the two hour mark, Kim Sik also dropped out, leaving Jo Jin-hyeong as the winner. Jo later commented that he was near his own breaking point.

Game 2: Fire of Prometheus 
The Fire of Prometheus had contestants running through an obstacle course in repetition to grab a torch; the person holding the last torch would win.

Winner

 Park Jin-yong

Eliminations

 Dustin Nippert
 Seol Ki-kwan
 Miracle Nelson

Nippert stumbled on the first obstacle in the first rep, and never regained the pace of the other three. The remaining matches were closer, hinging on Park Jin-yong scaling the obstacle cleanly and landing in a position to immediately begin running, while Miracle's body was twisting as he came over, leaving him just a moment slower to start running towards the torches.

Game 3: Wings of Icarus 
The Wings of Icarus had contestants climb a rope, and endure climbing for as long as possible, until only one contestant remained.

Winner

 Kim Min-cheol

Eliminations

 Song A-reum
 Kim Da-young
 Son Hee-dong

Song A-reum and Kim Da-young, the last two women in the competition, dropped out first. Son Hee-dong lasted a little bit longer, but ice climber Kim Min-cheol was easily able to secure victory.

Game 4: Tail of Ouroboros 
The Tail of Ouroboros had contestants chase each other around a track in a bid to tag out the person ahead of them, until only one remained.

Winner

 Woo Jin-yong

Eliminations

 Cha Hyun-seung
 Cho Jung-myung
 Jeong Han-saem

Game 5: Punishment of Sisyphus 
The Punishment of Sisyphus had contestants push a 100kg boulder up and over a hill every 40 seconds, as many times as possible, until only one remained.

Winner

 Jung Hae-min

Eliminations

 Ma Sun-ho
 Choo Sung-hoon
 Yun Sung-bin

All four were able to push the boulder over the hill many times, with the winner having the greatest stamina and cardio endurance.

Quest 5: The final quest 
The five survivors who competed in the final quest of Physical: 100 were Jo Jin-hyeong, Park Jin-yong, Kim Min-cheol, Woo Jin-yong, and Jung Hae-min. They competed in four games, with one contestant being eliminated in each game. The contestants started in a pentagonal formation, reducing at each stage until it became a dot.

Game 1 

The first game was a five-way tug of war, with all contestants trying to secure a key in front of them in order to unlock their padlock. Kim Min-cheol and Woo Jin-yong were the last two to unlock their padlocks, and did so nearly simultaneously.

Replays showed that Woo unlocked himself about a second before Kim did, resulting in Kim being eliminated even though he was a favourite to win following his victories in many of the prior quests.

Game 2 
The second game was a "square flip" challenge. The remaining four contestants split into teams of two and tried to flip as many tiles as possible for five minutes. The playing field contained 66 tile, with 33 of each colour facing up to begin the match. One side of each tile was white and the other was black, and the team with most tiles flipped to their colour won. The losing team had to compete with each other one on one for three minutes.

Jung Hae-min, as the first competitor to release himself in the tug-of-war game, was allowed to select his partner. After first selecting Woo Jin-yong, he changed his mind and instead selected Park Jin-yong. This team won the first team round by a score of 37-29. This left Jo Jin-hyeong and Woo Jin-yong to go head-to-head to progress to the third game. The smaller and quicker Woo easily won the head-to-head round 48-18, meaning Jo Jin-hyeong was eliminated.

Game 3 
The third game was a triangular shuttle run, with the remaining three contestants forced to run back and forth between their start point and the "next apex" before the next start signal.

The contestant who could not make it back to their original point before the next signal lost the game. After 85 reps, done without cease, Park Jin-yong collapsed at his starting position, which led to his elimination.

Game 4 
The fourth and final game was infinite rope-pulling. The two contestants had to pull their rope until it was loose, grab the other end of the rope, and then destroy their opponent's torso.

Woo Jin-yong won the final game and thus won Physical: 100, while Jung Hae-min was eliminated. Woo was personally covered in both Insider and The Straits Times after his victory on the show.

Reception

Viewership 
The show rose to be the most popular non-English show on Netflix on the third and fourth week after its release.

Critical Response 
The show received positive remarks from critics for destroying misconceptions around Asian bodies and expanding the definitions of strength. Some critics praised the show for "shattering the gender barrier" by showing women competing on par with elite male athletes, though others, such as Rachael Joo, an associate professor of American studies at Middlebury College, pointed out that the show coincided with a heightened attitude against gender equality in South Korea by designing stages favorable to those with a male body.

Controversies 
While the production team stated that there was no rematch in the final game, semi-finalist Jung Hae-min claimed that the final game was filmed twice. In the initial match, the game was halted by Woo's complaints of the equipment and again halted by the production team to oil the machines. When Jung was about to win again, the production team asked to move to a different location, citing issues with audio recording.

Many viewers alleged on social media that there was steroid use among the contestants. Some viewers also alleged that one of the contestants, Kim Da-young, was a school bully, and claimed that it was ironic for her to appear on a show that is not supposed to condone violence.

In popular culture 
On February 15, 2023, Netflix posted a tweet commending the women appearing on the show.

A TikTok challenge called the "hanging challenge" was inspired by Quest 0 of the show, and encourages participants to hang from a bar to test how long they can hold on. Participants in the challenge often use the same hanging style the contestants on the show did to hold on for a longer time.

Footnotes

References

External links

 
 
 
 

2023 South Korean television series debuts
2023 South Korean television series endings
2020s reality television series
2020s variety television series
Korean-language Netflix original programming
South Korean reality television series
South Korean variety television shows
Reality competition television series